John Bilson may refer to:

John Bilson (politician), Ghanaian politician and doctor
John F. O. Bilson (born 1948), Australian economic academic
John Bilson (architect) (1856–1943), British architect and architectural historian